Santo Stefano Quisquina (Sicilian: Santu Stèfanu Quisquina) is a comune (municipality) in the Province of Agrigento in the Italian region Sicily, located about  south of Palermo and about  north of Agrigento.

It has strong ties with Tampa, in the United States, since its immigrants supplied over 60 percent of the Italian population of the city in the late 19th and early 20th century. The town also supplied a large portion of Italian immigrants to Jacksonville, another city in Florida.

History
The first nucleus of the present-day town probably dates back to the reign of Frederick II of Aragon (1296–1337), when it was a fief of Giovanni Caltagirone. Its successive lords were Ruggero Sinisi, Guiscardo de Agijas, the Lacarns and the Ventimiglias.

People
Lorenzo Panepinto (1865 - 1911), a teacher and peasant leader killed by the Sicilian Mafia.

References

Cities and towns in Sicily